"Basmanny Justice" is a term used to characterize the judicial system that emerged in the 2000s in Russia and is distinguished by a low degree of independence of the judiciary in decision-making. The decisions made by the dependent judiciary are considered convenient for the authorities or necessary for them, but run counter to the rule of law.

Sometimes it is used in a semantic meaning as a custom-made court, an instrument of political repression, synonymous with the lack of independence of the court as a whole.

Russia. The term and the phenomenon it describes have been the subject of debate among journalists, lawyers and authorities, including former Russian President Dmitry Medvedev and Moscow City Court chairperson .

History of origin 
In November 2003, the term was used, inter alia, by Grigory Yavlinsky and Boris Nemtsov.

Opinions 
In 2004, the chairman of the Supreme Arbitration Court of Russia , expressed the opinion that the presence of a stable label "Basmanny Justice" contributes to a critical assessment of the work of Russian judges:

In 2005, the chairperson of the Moscow City Court, Olga Yegorova, confirmed that "the term really exists," and the book "Basmanny Justice" published by Yukos' lawyer Karinna Moskalenko and her colleagues contains "interesting additional information" that prompted the chairperson of the court to remind the judges subordinate to her demands "clearly comply with the procedural and substantive law, promptly and competently consider each case, since behind each of them are people, their interests, rights, destinies." "There is no longer either Mosgorshtamp or Basmanny Justice," Olga Yegorova argued in 2011.

In December 2009, this term was commented on by the then President of Russia Dmitry Medvedev:

Examples of using the term 

 2004 – the trials of Platon Lebedev and Mikhail Khodorkovsky in the 
 April 2006 – cancellation of the second acquittal in the case of Arakcheev and Khudyakov
 November 2007 – the arrest of the head of the operational support department of the FDCS, police lieutenant general 
 November 2007 – arrest of the deputy minister of finance of the Russian Federation Storchak
 January 2009 – authorization of the arrest of Evgeny Chichvarkin, founder of the Euroset company
 Spring – summer 2012 — , also used — "Khamovnicheskoe justice"
 October 2012 – the arrest of a Russian opposition figure Leonid Razvozzhaev
 2019 – a criminal case on alleged riots and cases of violence against police officers during a protest rally For Fair Elections
 2020 – refusal to initiate a criminal case in connection with the poisoning of opposition leader Alexei Navalny

See also 

 Dmitry Shemyaka
 Kangaroo court
 Show trial

References

External links 
 
 
 
 
 
 
 

Law of Russia
2000s in Russia
2010s in Russia
Russian words and phrases